Children of the World is a 1976 album by the Bee Gees.

Children of the World may also refer to:
Children of the World (Stan Getz album), an album by saxophonist Stan Getz
"Children Of The World", a song by Julian Lennon
Children's Everywhere, also known as Children of the World, a Swedish photo book series by Anna Riwkin-Brick